This is a list of television programs that have won the most Primetime Emmy Awards at their respective ceremonies. Only major awards are counted.

Most per ceremony